Lamb is a 2021 folk horror film directed by Valdimar Jóhannsson, who also co-wrote the screenplay with Sjón. The film's plot is about the birth of a human/sheep hybrid of mysterious origin and the couple who adopts the child as their own. An international co-production between Iceland, Sweden, and Poland, the film stars Noomi Rapace, and marks Valdimar's feature-length directorial debut. Rapace and Béla Tarr were executive producers. After premiering at the 2021 Cannes Film Festival, the film was released in Iceland on 24 September 2021. It was selected as the Icelandic entry for the Best International Feature Film at the 94th Academy Awards.

Plot
In Iceland, a herd of horses is spooked by an unknown, loudly-breathing entity that makes its way to a barn. Later, farmer María and her husband Ingvar are shocked when one of their pregnant sheep gives birth to a human/sheep hybrid with a mostly human body and a lamb's head and right arm.

María and Ingvar take the hybrid infant in as their own and grow to love her as their own child, naming her Ada after Maria's deceased daughter. Ada's biological mother becomes a nuisance, attempting to contact Ada constantly and loitering outside the couple's home. Shortly after an incident where Ada goes missing and is later found next to the mother, María shoots Ada's mother and buries her body in a shallow, unmarked grave. Unbeknownst to her, Ingvar's brother Pétur, who arrives at the farmhouse shortly before the killing, witnesses the incident before sleeping in the barn.

Pétur, who makes sexual advances towards María, is very disturbed by Ada and maintains the belief that "it's an animal, not a child". Ingvar claims the whole situation has given them happiness. Increasingly angered and disturbed by María and Ingvar's attachment to Ada, Pétur takes her on an early morning walk while everyone is asleep with the intention of shooting her. After having a tearful change of heart, however, he is later seen soundly sleeping with Ada and soon becomes an uncle to her.

One evening, while María, Pétur, and Ingvar are having a drunken party, Ada witnesses the unknown entity from before near the barn. The entity then proceeds to kill the family's dog before taking the family's gun. After the party, a drunk Ingvar goes to bed. Pétur makes sexual advances towards María once again. When she rejects his advances, Pétur reveals that he witnessed María killing Ada's sheep mother, trying to blackmail María into having sex with him by threatening to reveal this to Ada. María pretends to be seduced by Pétur in order to lock him in a closet. 

María drives him to the bus stop the next morning and sends him away, insisting she is committed to a new start with her family. After waking up to find María and Pétur missing, Ingvar takes Ada to fix a broken tractor. On their way back home, the entity, revealed to be a ram/man hybrid and Ada's biological father, emerges and shoots Ingvar in the neck, before taking a tearful Ada with him and walking away into the wilderness.

María returns home and finds that Ingvar and Ada are missing. She searches for the two and discovers Ingvar before he dies, and despairs at the loss of her husband and new child. María searches the wilderness in vain, before closing her tear-filled eyes.

Cast
 Noomi Rapace as María
 Hilmir Snær Guðnason as Ingvar
 Björn Hlynur Haraldsson as Pétur
 Ingvar Eggert Sigurðsson as Man on Television

Production

In February 2019, Noomi Rapace and Hilmir Snær Guðnason had joined the cast of the film, with Valdimar Jóhannsson directing from a screenplay he wrote alongside Sjón.

Release
In June 2020, the film was sold across Europe in the New Europe Film Sales agency. The film was picked up by distributors in Czech Republic (Artcam), France (The Jokers), Switzerland (Filmcoopi), Slovakia (ASFK), Germany (Koch Films), Poland (Gutek Film), Benelux (The Searchers), Hungary (Vertigo), Austria (Filmladen), Denmark (Camera Film), Lithuania (Scanorama), former Yugoslavia (Five Stars/Demiurg), Estonia (Must Käsi) and Latvia (Kino Bize) with MUBI acquiring the distribution rights for Latin America (excluding Mexico), Turkey, India, the UK and Ireland. In July 2021, A24 acquired North American distribution rights to the film.

The film had its world premiere on 13 July 2021 as part of the official selection at the 2021 Cannes Film Festival in the Un Certain Regard section.  It was released in the United States on 8 October 2021. The film also had a special screening of BFI London Film Festival on 15 October 2021

Reception

Box office 
In the United States and Canada, Lamb was released alongside No Time to Die and was debuted to $1 million from 583 theaters, finishing seventh and marking the best-ever opening weekend for an Icelandic film in the U.S.

Critical response 
 

David Fear of Rolling Stone described the film as "the odd, unsettling, soon-to-be-your-cult-movie-of-choice straight outta Iceland", and wrote: "It's the sweetest, most touching waking nightmare you've ever experienced." Jeannette Catsoulis of The New York Times called the film an "atmospheric debut feature", and added that it "plays like a folk tale and thrums like a horror movie." She wrote: "Slow-moving and inarguably nutty, Lamb nevertheless wields its atavistic power with the straightest of faces". Michael O'Sullivan of The Washington Post also described the film as a "haunting, atmospheric feature debut", and wrote: "Johannsson has a way of imbuing everything — animate and inanimate, even an empty doorway — with a kind of living, breathing spirit." He gave the film a score of 3/4 stars. Katie Walsh of the Los Angeles Times wrote, "Ominous mountains look down upon the pastoral arena where this fantastical yet meditative rural drama plays out; it's a modern folk tale about the strange realities of life and death that such a closeness to nature affords." Joe Morgenstern of The Wall Street Journal described the film as "a shaggy lamb story expertly told." Kevin Maher of The Times gave the film 4/5 stars, writing, "The director, Valdimar Johannsson, treats the admittedly ridiculous material with a convincing, deadpan seriousness and is supported at every step by his star performer on impeccable form."

Richard Brody of The New Yorker was more critical of the film, saying that it "preens and strains to be admired even as it reduces its characters to pieces on a game board and its actors to puppets." Barry Hertz of The Globe and Mail criticized the film's ending as being "like a parody of an A24 horror movie", and wrote, "I won't make the obvious joke and say it's baaad. But its sheep thrills are mutton to write home about, either." Alison Willmore of Vulture wrote, "By the time the final act rolls around, Lamb approaches the idea that there's a price that must be paid with a shrugging diffidence rather than impending doom. It's such an underwhelming conclusion to a film with such a compelling start."

Some critics have compared the film to a reversal of the Ancient Greek Minotaur myth, further linking the mythology of Lamb to Hellenic origins.

See also
 List of submissions to the 94th Academy Awards for Best International Feature Film
 List of Icelandic submissions for the Academy Award for Best International Feature Film

References

External links
 

2021 films
2021 drama films
2020s monster movies
2021 fantasy films
2020s Icelandic-language films
Swedish drama films
Swedish fantasy films
Icelandic drama films
Icelandic fantasy films
Polish drama films
Polish fantasy films
A24 (company) films
Folk horror films
Films about families
Films about sheep
Films set on farms
Films set in Iceland
2021 directorial debut films
2020s American films